Mark DeSimone was a member of the Arizona House of Representatives for a single term. He represented the 11th District during the 48th Legislature, winning the November 2006 election.

On the last day of the legislative session in 2008 DeSimone was arrested for spousal abuse.  A few days later, he resigned his seat.  The civil charges were dropped after counseling. (2008)

He was unsuccessful in his bid for re-election in 2008.

In June, 2019, DeSimone was sentenced to 65 years' imprisonment for the 2016 first-degree murder of his friend, Duilio Antonio "Tony" Rosales, during a vacation in Alaska. In what DeSimone claimed was an accident, Rosales was shot twice in the back of the head.

References

Living people
Democratic Party members of the Arizona House of Representatives
American people convicted of murder
People convicted of murder by Alaska
Year of birth missing (living people)